The 2018 Pan American Women's Junior Handball Championship was the 12th edition of the tournament, Took place in the city of Goiânia, Brazil at the Goiânia Arena from 21 to 25 March 2018. It acts as the American qualifying tournament for the 2018 Women's Junior World Handball Championship.

Results

All times are local (UTC−03:00).

Final standing

References

External links
CBHb official website
Goiás handball federation official website

Pan American Women's Junior Handball Championship
Pan American Women's Junior Handball Championship
Pan American Women's Junior Handball Championship
Junior
March 2018 sports events in South America
2018 in Brazilian women's sport